Ladhuwas Ahir is a village in Rewari district, Haryana, India. It is near Saharanwas village on the Rewari - Kanina - Mahendragarh road. As per 2011 census, there are 275 households. Out of 1,298 persons, 680 are male and 618 are female.

References 

Villages in Rewari district